The Bran Flakes are a Canadian-American indie pop group formed in Seattle in 1992. The group, whose line-up comprises Otis Fodder from Montreal, Quebec, and Mildred Pitt from Seattle, Washington, specializes in creating sound collages from pre-existing sources. Until 1997, they recorded on 4-track in bedrooms and did not play any shows, putting out hand dubbed cassette tapes and distributing tapes through direct mail-order, zines and indie catalogs.

Career
The Bran Flakes make extensive use of sampling, recontextualizing the samples into new works, often resulting in ironic statements about modern pop and media culture. The group scours thrift shops for obscure and quirky LPs; some of their songs also make use of recognizably famous basslines, television shows, and soundtracks from video games. The unauthorized nature of such sampling has prevented much of the band's work from official commercial release. However, they did contribute six tracks to the fully authorized Raymond Scott Rewired, an album of Scott remixes (including tracks by The Evolution Control Committee and Go Home Productions) which was released in February 2014 on the Basta label.

Following the 1998 release of I Remember When I Break Down on Ovenguard Music, on which Otis Fodder was sole writer, the group's first album as a duo (Otis Fodder and Mildred Pitt) was in 1999, with Hey Won't Somebody Come and Play on Ovenguard Music. I Don't Have a Friend was released in 2001 on Lomo Records. Their 2002 album Bounces! was released on the band's own Happi Tyme Records, and contained one of their most popular songs; "Good Times a Goo Goo", which sampled extensively from Kermit the Frog and Fozzie Bear's performance of "Moving Right Along" from The Muppet Movie.

In 2008 the band signed with the label Illegal Art, known for such acts as Girl Talk and Steinski.

Personnel 

Principal members
 Otis Fodder (1992–present)
 Mildred Pitt (1999–present)

Live show members
 Courtney Barnebey (1998–2012)
 Peter Lynch (1998–2012)
 Anil Kainth (1998–2012)
 Julie Alpert (1998–2012)
 Joanna Barnebey (1998–2012)
 Pam Landinez (1998–2012)
 Joseph Ellis (2003–2012)

Discography 

The Bran Flakes have a discography consisting of seven studio albums, one remix album, one compilation album and two singles.

Studio albums

Remix albums

Compilation albums

Singles

Live performances 

1998
 Omnimedia V0.3 (January 24)
 Church of the Subgenius Devival (March 14–15)
 Coffee Messiah (May 2)
 Omnimedia V0.5 (October 17–18)
1999
 Meet the Sonicabal (February 20)
 Electromuse2 Festival (May 14–21)
 Art's Edge Festival (June 27)
2000
 Sonicabal 2 Showcase (September 23)
 Halloween Fright Night (October 31)
2001
 I Don't Have a Friend Release Party (May 24)
 7th Annual Olympia Experimental Music Festival (June 16)
 Nova Nights Freak Out Party (October 25)
2002
 Bounces! Release Party (November 6)
 Sonarchy (November 16)
2003
 Nerd Rock (February 3)
2004
 I.D.E.A.L. Festival (March 6)
2005
 Brides of Frankenstein (August 6)
2009
 Sepomana Festival (April 18)
2011
 Convergence Festival (September 4)
2012
 ONN/OF Festival (January 28)

References

External links

The Bran Flakes
The Bran Flakes website
Illegal Art

Band members
Otis Fodder's website
Mildred Pitt's website

Interviews
 Radio Feature, The Some Assembly Required Interview with The Bran Flakes.

Bran Flakes, The